An Atlas of Illustrations of Clinical Medicine, Surgery and Pathology is a medical book of images first published in 1901 by John Bale, Sons & Danielsson. It contains the widely cited photograph taken by Allan Warner of two 13-year old boys from the same class, who after coming into contact with smallpox, the vaccinated boy remained well and the boy who did not receive the vaccine developed the disease.

References

Medical books
20th-century books